Pilot Butte Airport  is located  south-west of Pilot Butte, Saskatchewan, Canada.

See also 
 List of airports in Saskatchewan

References 

Pilot Butte, Saskatchewan
Registered aerodromes in Saskatchewan
Edenwold No. 158, Saskatchewan